Minuscule 57 (in the Gregory-Aland numbering), δ 255 (Von Soden), is a Greek minuscule manuscript of the New Testament, on parchment leaves. It has been palaeographically assigned to the 12th century.
The manuscript is lacunose. It has marginalia.

Description 

The codex contains the entirety of the New Testament except the Book of Revelation, on 291 parchment leaves (size ), with two lacunae (Mark 1:1-11 and at the end). The leaves are arranged in quarto (four leaves in quire). The text is written in one column per page, 25 lines per page. Psalms and Hymns follow the Epistles.
The initial letters and headpieces are illuminated. It has accents and breathings, and contains the nomina sacra throughout. It is written in small, beautiful letters with abbreviations. The initial letters are in gold.

It contains lectionary markings in the margin, written in red ink (for liturgical use), but added by a later hand.

It has the following order of books: Gospels, Acts, Catholic epistles, Pauline epistles, Psalms, and Hymns.

Text 

The Greek text of the codex is a representative of the Byzantine text-type. Aland placed it in Category V.

It was not examined using the Claremont Profile Method.

History 

The manuscript was written in Constantinople, in the 3rd quarter of the 12th century, with additions up to the end of the 14th century including a note relating to Epeiros.

Walton used it for a Polyglot (as Magd. 1). Henry Hammond collated the manuscript twice. It was also examined by Wettstein (in 1715), Orlando T. Dobbin (for John Mill), and C. R. Gregory (in 1883).

It is currently housed in the Magdalen College (Gr. 9), at Oxford.

See also 

 List of New Testament minuscules
 Biblical manuscript
 Textual criticism

References

Further reading 

 Orlando Dobbin, Collation of the Codex Montfortianus (London, 1854), p. 28-30.

External links 

 Minuscule 57 at Oxford University
 Online images of Minuscule 57 at the CSNTM.

Greek New Testament minuscules
12th-century biblical manuscripts
Septuagint manuscripts
Magdalen College, Oxford